Heterobostrychus brunneus, the boxwood borer, is a species of horned powder-post beetle in the family Bostrichidae. It is found in Africa, Australia, Europe and Northern Asia (excluding China), and North America.

References

Further reading

 
 

Bostrichidae
Articles created by Qbugbot
Beetles described in 1867